The BJEV EC3 is an all-electric car manufactured by BAIC Motor Electric Vehicle Co Ltd. The maker is a wholly owned subsidiary of BAIC Group. The BJEV EC180 made its first public appearance at the 2016 Guangzhou Auto Show in China and, as of November 2016, was to be launched on the Chinese auto market in the first quarter of 2017. It was originally BJEV EC180 from the BJEV EC series.

Specifications

EC180

The BJEV EC180 is the entry product of the BJEV brand. Price including subsidies ranges from 49,800 yuan to 55,800 yuan. It has an electric motor producing 41hp and 140nm of torque. The BJEV EC180 has a 20.3 kWh battery pack giving a range of 180 kilometers. Top speed is 100 kilometers per hour and a full charge on 220V takes seven hours.

The BJEV EC180 was available as part of the EvCard electric car-sharing service in China.

EC3

The BJEV EC3 is the facelifted EC180 NEV. The EC5 debuted during the 2018 Chengdu Auto Show as an update to be more inline with the rest of the BJEV models. 

The BJEV EC3 is equipped with a 45kW and 150N-m electric motor and a 30.66kWh battery. The NEDC tested range is 261 kilometers.

References

External links
 Official EC3 Website
 BAIC Official site

BJEV EC3
Production electric cars
2010s cars
City cars
Cars introduced in 2016
Cars of China